Saq (also Romanized as Sāq; also known as Sagh and Sāqī) is a village in Amanabad Rural District, in the Central District of Arak County, Markazi Province, Iran. At the 2006 census, its population was 22, in 9 families.

References 

Populated places in Arak County